Tevita Naqali (born 1996) is a Fijian professional rugby union player who plays as a lock for Old Glory DC in Major League Rugby (MLR).

He previously played for Fijian Drua in the Australian National Rugby Championship, Fijian Latui in Global Rapid Rugby and Valladolid RAC in the División de Honor de Rugby.

References

1994 births
Living people
Fijian Drua players
Fijian rugby union players
Old Glory DC players
Rugby union locks